The men's 73 kilograms (lightweight) competition at the 2010 Asian Games in Guangzhou was held on 15 November at the Huagong Gymnasium.

Schedule
All times are China Standard Time (UTC+08:00)

Results
Legend
WO — Won by walkover

Main bracket

Final

Top half

Bottom half

Repechage

References
Results

External links
Draw

M73
Judo at the Asian Games Men's Lightweight